Rodrigo Fabián Cantero (born 19 July 1985) was a Paraguayan footballer. His last club was Fernando de la Mora.

References
 Profile at BDFA 
 

1985 births
Living people
People from Fernando de la Mora, Paraguay
Paraguayan footballers
Paraguayan expatriate footballers
General Caballero Sport Club footballers
Sportivo Trinidense footballers
12 de Octubre Football Club players
Club Nacional footballers
Ñublense footballers
Chilean Primera División players
Expatriate footballers in Chile
Association football midfielders